Tailback can mean:
 A position in American football at the "tail" end of the offensive formation, typically a halfback 
 A line of motor vehicles caught up in traffic congestion; a traffic jam

See also
Back (American football)
Takeback (disambiguation)